Thomas Faucheron (born 23 February 1990, in Rennes) is a French archer. At the 2012 Summer Olympics he competed in the Men's team event and the men's individual event.  In the individual event, he was 27th after the ranking rounds, and beat Witthaya Thamwong in the first knockout round before losing to teammate Gael Prevost in the second.  In the team event, France were ranked second after the ranking round but lost to Mexico in the quarterfinals.

In 2013, he was part of the French men's team that won bronze at the World Championship, alongside Prevost and Jean-Charles Valladont.  The French team beat Spain and Italy before losing to the USA in the semifinal.  In the bronze medal match, France beat South Korea by one point, 228 to 227.

References

External links
 
 

French male archers
1990 births
Living people
Olympic archers of France
Archers at the 2012 Summer Olympics
Sportspeople from Rennes
World Archery Championships medalists
Universiade medalists in archery
Universiade bronze medalists for France
Medalists at the 2011 Summer Universiade
21st-century French people